Two Birds with the Wings of One is a ballet made by Jean-Pierre Bonnefoux for New York City Ballet's Diamond Project to two poems from the Sung Dynasty and "Chi Lin's Dance" from Flute Moon by Bright Sheng. The premiere took place on May 25, 2006, at New York State Theater, Lincoln Center.

Original cast
  
Sofiane Sylve

Andrew Veyette

Reviews
NY Times review by John Rockwell, May 27, 2006
NY Times article by John Rockwell, June 20, 2006

2006 ballet premieres
Ballets by Jean-Pierre Bonnefoux
Ballets to the music of Bright Sheng
New York City Ballet Diamond Project
New York City Ballet repertory